Sharad Kumar (born 28 October 1955) is a former  Indian Police Service (IPS)  officer, who is Vigilance Commissioner of the Central Vigilance Commission and former Director General (DG) of National Investigation Agency. On superannuation  he  was  employed, in the same post, on contract for period of one year.  As a contractor, he is not bound by the All India Service rule norms.

Background and education 
Sharad Kumar is a Graduate in Science (BSc). Kumar was born in Bareilly, Uttar Pradesh. Graduation from Bareilly college, Bareilly.

Career

As an IPS
Kumar joined the Haryana cadre of the Indian Police Service in 1979. His previous post was director general (prisons) in Haryana. Kumar was posted as DSP in Gurgaon, Ambala and Rohtak. He remained the Inspector General of Police, Rohtak range for nearly three years and was promoted to the rank of Additional Director General of Police (ADGP) in November, 2007.
Kumar was deployed to the Central Bureau of Investigation from July 1991 to July 1999 as SP and DIG.

He has served as the Director General of National Investigation Agency from August 2013 to October 2017 and subsequently retired from NIA.

In the Central Vigilance Commission
On 10 June 2018, he was appointed as vigilance commissioner in Central Vigilance Commission for a term of four years or till he attains the age of 65, whichever is earlier.

In June 2019, he has been named interim Central Vigilance Commissioner until a new incumbent is chosen by the selection panel headed by Prime Minister Narendra Modi.

Awards
He has received President's Police Medals for Meritorious and Distinguished services in the year 1996 and 2004 respectively.

See also 
 National Investigation Agency

References 

Living people
Indian police officers
Indian police chiefs
Indian civil servants
1955 births